John Yates Beall (January 1, 1835 – February 24, 1865) was a Confederate privateer in the American Civil War who was arrested as a spy in New York and executed at Fort Columbus on Governors Island.

Early life and education
Beall was born in Jefferson County, Virginia (now West Virginia) on his father's farm, Walnut Grove. He attended the University of Virginia to study law but upon the death of his father in 1855 he left his studies to take up farming.

Civil War
At the start of the war, Beall joined Bott's Grays, Company G, in the 2nd Virginia Infantry. He received a wound in the lungs which left him incapable of active service.

Inspired by John Hunt Morgan, he conceived a plan to launch privateers on the Great Lakes. He presented his plan to Confederate authorities, who were interested but declined to act since it might endanger relations with neutral Britain. Beall was commissioned as acting master in the Confederate States Navy, though not given a command. He then proceeded on his own as a privateer, active in the areas of the Potomac River and Chesapeake Bay. He assembled a crew of 18 men and commanded two boats, The Raven and The Swan. His second in command was a 22-year-old Scotsman named Bennet G. Burley. Beall was captured by Union forces in November 1863 and jailed at Fort McHenry, in Baltimore, until he was released in a prisoner exchange on May 5, 1864.

Upon his release, he returned to the north shore of Lake Erie to Canada West, part of the Province of Canada, in order to implement a plan to free Confederate prisoners on Johnson's Island. On September 18, 1864, a small group of volunteers embarked from Sandwich and Amherstburg, Canada West, and, with Beall, captured the ship Philo Parsons off Kelleys Island, and then the Island Queen, which was scuttled. The plan included capturing the U.S. gunboat Michigan. However, at this point the crew refused to proceed further without outside assistance. Beall reluctantly agreed, and together they sailed back to Sandwich (the former name of and now a neighborhood of Windsor, Ontario), where they scuttled the Philo Parsons and separated, all escaping arrest except for Burley, whose extradition was demanded by U.S. authorities.

Beall then decided to free some captured Confederate officers by derailing a passenger train, but he and a companion, George S. Anderson, were arrested in Niagara, New York, on December 16, 1864. They were imprisoned at Fort Lafayette, New York. Anderson agreed to testify against Beall in return for leniency.

General John Adams Dix ordered a military commission for Beall's trial, which began on January 17, 1865. He was represented by James T. Brady. The arrest of Beall had not been published in any newspaper, and Confederate authorities were unaware of his status. On February 8, the commission found him guilty on all charges and sentenced him to death. Beall was then transported to and held at Fort Columbus on Governors Island in New York Harbor to await his execution.

The story of Beall's arrest and trial then appeared in the newspapers, and efforts were made to save him. Appeals were made to President Abraham Lincoln by many prominent people, including six U.S. Senators and 91 members of Congress, but Lincoln refused to intervene, not wanting to undermine Dix's authority. Beall was executed on February 24, 1865.

Notes

Further reading

References
 The South in the Building of the Nation, The Southern Historical Publication Society, Richmond, VA, 1909, Volume XI, pgs. 61-62.
 Beall, John Yates & Daniel B. Lucas, Memoir of John Yates Beall: His Life; Trial; Correspondence; Diary; and Private Manuscript Found Among His Papers, Including His Own Account of the Raid on Lake Erie, J. Lovell, 1865
 Trial of John Y. Beall: As a Spy and Guerrillero, by Military Commission, United States. Army. Military Commission, D. Appleton and Co., 1865
 Headley, John W, Confederate Operations in Canada and New York, Neale Publishing Co., 1906. Reprint ed. 1981 Time-Life Books Inc.
 Horan, James D. Confederate Agent, A Discovery in History, Crown, 1954.
 Lewis, Lloyd. Myths After Lincoln, New York: Grosset & Dunlap - Grosset's Universal Library, 1929, 1957, p. 169-170.
 Ryall, Lydia Jane.  "Sketches and Stories of the Lake Erie Islands" 1913

External links
John Yates Beall at Encyclopedia Virginia

1835 births
1865 deaths
19th-century executions of American people
Acts of sabotage
American Civil War spies
Burials at Zion Episcopal Churchyard (Charles Town, West Virginia)
Confederate States Navy officers
Executed people from West Virginia
Executed spies
Farmers from West Virginia
Military personnel from West Virginia
People executed by the United States military by hanging
People from Jefferson County, West Virginia
American privateers
University of Virginia alumni
People of Virginia in the American Civil War
People of West Virginia in the American Civil War
Beall family of Maryland
Confederate States Army personnel who were court-martialed